Joseph Bernard Pasqua (July 31, 1918 – December 10, 1998) was an American football offensive tackle in the National Football League for the Cleveland Rams, the Washington Redskins, and the Los Angeles Rams. He attended Southern Methodist University.

1918 births
1998 deaths
Players of American football from Dallas
American football offensive tackles
American military personnel of World War II
SMU Mustangs football players
Cleveland Rams players
Washington Redskins players
Los Angeles Rams players
American people of Italian descent
Southern Methodist University alumni